Dogwoman is a series of Australian television telemovies screened on the Nine Network in 2000. The telemovies were created by and starred Magda Szubanski as Margaret O'Halloran. Margaret, a professional dog trainer, is drawn into a world of mystery, intrigue, and murder, which lies beneath the surface of dog-owners. Tara Morice played her sister Pauline O'Halloran and Raj Ryan played her boyfriend Brian Jayasinghe. 
  
The telemovies were produced by Beyond Simpson Le Mesurier, who also produced such series as Halifax f.p. and Stingers.

Titles
There were three telemovies produced in the series:
Dogwoman: The Legend of Dogwoman
Dogwoman: A Grrrl's Best Friend
Dogwoman: Dead Dog Walking

Cast
Magda Szubanski as Margaret O'Halloran
Tara Morice as Pauline O'Halloran
Raj Ryan as Brian Jayasinghe

Guests
Alison Whyte as Jacinta Davies
Susie Dee as Lorraine O'Halloran
Frank Magree as Ray Davies
Leo Taylor as Arthur O'Halloran
Paul Gleeson as Don Groom
Andrew Blackman as Mac (Paul) McDonald
Tiriel Mora as Supt. Gary Brodziak
 Alicia Gardiner as Varna O'Halloran
Simon Lyndon as Matt Hayduke
Sandy Winton as Jeremy Maitland
Anthony Simcoe as Andrew Bell
Anne Phelan as Joan Jarvis
Gandhi Macintyre as Mr Jayosinghe
Arianthe Galani as Mrs Jayosinghe

See also 
 List of Australian television series

References

2000 Australian television series debuts
2000 Australian television series endings
Australian drama television series
Television shows set in Victoria (Australia)